Events in the year 1823 in Brazil.

Incumbents
 Monarch – Pedro I

Events

Births
 17 February - Princess Paula of Brazil
 1 May - José Antônio Saraiva
 10 August - Gonçalves Dias

Deaths

References

 
1820s in Brazil
Years of the 19th century in Brazil
Brazil
Brazil